SGIC may refer to:

SGIC, formerly State Government Insurance Commission, a South Australian insurance company
Seoul Guarantee Insurance Company, a Korean trade insurance company
SGIC, former stock symbol for Silicon Graphics